Kemson Fofanah (born 23 May 1994) is a Sierra Leonean football defender who plays for East End Lions.

References

1994 births
Living people
Sierra Leonean footballers
Sierra Leone international footballers
East End Lions F.C. players
Boldklubben af 1893 players
Association football defenders
Sierra Leonean expatriate footballers
Expatriate men's footballers in Denmark
Sierra Leonean expatriate sportspeople in Denmark
Danish 2nd Division players
Sportspeople from Freetown